The Rise Of Bloody Mary or Bloody Mary is a 2022 Indian Telugu-language crime drama film directed by Chandoo Mondeti and written by Prasanth Kumar Dimmala. It stars Nivetha Pethuraj, Brahmaji, Ajay, and Kireeti Damaraju. Set in Visakhapatnam, the plot follows three orphaned childhood friends—Mary, Raju, and Basha who find themselves embroiled in a murder case.

The film began its production in September 2020 in Hyderabad. It features music composed by Kaala Bhairava and cinematography by Karthik Ghattamneni. Bloody Mary is digitally released on 15 April 2022 on the streaming platform Aha.

Plot 
One night in 1993, in Vizag, an orphanage is attacked by a group of human traffickers. The director of the orphanage is killed and all the kids from the orphanage are abducted, except for three kids with physical impairments - Mary, Basha, and Raju. Mary is the daughter of the orphanage's director, and she overhears her mother's death. Since she was not an eyewitness to the crime, the police do not register her as a witness statement.

A few years later, Mary is working at a hospital while taking care of Basha and Raju. Basha, who is mute, has aspirations of becoming an actor. Raju, who is deaf, dreams of becoming a photographer. One day, Kantha Rao, a doctor working at the hospital Mary is working, calls Mary for an opportunity she has been looking for. When she reaches there, he makes improper sexual advances toward her which she resists. In the ensuing scuffle, Mary pushes him causing his death. Meanwhile, the same day, Basha witnesses a similar death when he goes to a film director's office to audition for a role. The director tries to sexually assault Kala, an aspiring actress, who retaliates by hitting him on the head to his death. A little later, Raju finds a camera that he brings home. There, the three of them find a video of the death Basha witnessed earlier. They also find out that the director was killed by Kala's husband, Prabhakar, who followed her out of suspicion that she was cheating on their marriage.

Prabhakar, who is a local Circle Inspector (CI), starts investigating the death of Kantha Rao. He is suspicious of Mary and interrogates her, Basha and Raju. Mary sketches a plan and together with Bash and Raju, anonymously blackmails Prabhakar for money in exchange for the video of him killing the film director. But he tracks down the blackmail call to the three and destroys the evidence. He also learns that Mary is partially blind. But Mary bluffs and convinces Prabhakar that she has transferred the video onto another computer before. Knowing that Prabhakar is at loggerheads with Sekhar Babu, a powerful local businessman in the fishing industry, Mary reaches out to Sekhar Babu and offers him the evidence in exchange for their safety. She meets Kala and gets to confess to the truth on camera by bluffing she has evidence against her. Mary also realises that Sekhar Babu is a human trafficker, and was the one who killed her mother, and is now planning on trafficking her and Basha and Raju's organs. She calls Prabhakar and cleverly pits him against Sekhar Babu. In the ensuing fight, Prabhakar kills most of Sekhar Babu's henchmen, while Mary kills Sekhar Babu.

Eight years later, Mary, under a new alias, heads a very powerful social welfare organisation in Mumbai, with many unproven allegations of crime. The government appoints Prabhakar, who was awarded a President's Police Medal for ending Sekhar Babu's trafficking ring, to investigate the organisation. The film ends with Prabhakar meeting Mary who details her rise and threatens him not to interfere in her business.

Cast 

 Nivetha Pethuraj as Mary
 Brahmaji as Sekhar Babu
 Ajay as CI Prabhakar 
 Kireeti Damaraju as Basha
 Rajkumar Kasireddy as Raju
 Pammi Sai as Appi
 Hemanth
 Kamal
 Basha
 Aradhya
 Giri
 Aumkar
 Naveena Reddy as Kala
 Ramani

Production and release 
The film began its production in September 2020 in Hyderabad. Blood Mary is director Chandoo Mondeti's first foray into the digital medium. It is released digitally on 15 April 2022 on the streaming platform Aha.

Reception 
The Times of India critic Neeshita Nyayapati called it a "passable thriller" writing, "Bloody Mary falls short of being a complex and grey film because it doesn't go the extra mile to tell a novel story." She appreciated the performances of Pethuraj and Ajay, in addition to the technical aspects of the film. Reviewing the film for The Hindu, Sangeetha Devi called it "sketchy," criticising the narration and weak characterization.

Subbarao N of NTV criticized the story and screenplay while being appreciative of the performances, score and camerawork. A reviewer from Pinkvilla also felt the same, stating: "When 'Bloody Mary' doesn't frustrate you with its superficial performances, the sheer quantum of convenient plot points does."

References

External links 
 Blood Mary on Aha
 

2022 films
2020s Telugu-language films
Films shot in Hyderabad, India
Films scored by Kaala Bhairava
Aha (streaming service) original films
Indian crime drama films
2022 crime drama films
Films set in Visakhapatnam
Films set in Andhra Pradesh